Hovongan (Hobongan), or Punan Bungan, is a Kayan language of West Kalimantan, Indonesia, one of several spoken by the Penan people.

References

Languages of Indonesia
Müller-Schwaner languages